Omar Benjelloun (1936, in Oujda – 18 December 1975, in Casablanca) was a Moroccan journalist, engineer, lawyer and trade union activist.

Biography
Omar Benjelloun was born in 1936 in Oujda. He comes from one of the most affluent families in Morocco; nevertheless he attended French school and later studied law in France. Following his graduation in telecommunications and law in Paris, Benjelloun returned to Morocco to take up a post as a regional director in telecommunications in Casablanca. In 1959, after leaving the Istiqlal Party with other members, he went on to become the general secretary of the socialist party USFP (Union Socialiste des Forces Populaires), of which he had been a founding member, and editor of its newspaper Al Muharrir.

In 1963 he received a death sentence under the rule of Hassan II, but was later pardoned. He was again arrested in 1966 and 1973 and subjected to torture.

On 18 December 1975 he was stabbed or battered to death in front of his home in Casablanca. It is suspected that he was killed by the Shabiba Islamiya. After Benjelloun's assassination, Abdelkrim Motii, founder of the Shabiba Islamiya, had to flee Morocco.

References

1936 births
1975 deaths
Assassinated Moroccan people
Moroccan male journalists
Moroccan politicians
Moroccan prisoners and detainees
Moroccan torture victims
People from Oujda
Victims of human rights abuses
20th-century journalists